"Eat You Alive" is a song by the band Limp Bizkit. It was released in September 2003 as a single from their fourth studio album Results May Vary (2003). The song was written by Fred Durst, John Otto, Sam Rivers and Mike Smith, and is Limp Bizkit's first single without Wes Borland, who had left the band in 2001.

Release and reception 
In promotion of the single, Durst filmed a music video featuring known actors Thora Birch and Bill Paxton. The single peaked at number 16 on the Billboard Hot Mainstream Rock Tracks chart.

Allmusic gave the single one out of five stars. A 2004 readers poll published by Spin tied "Eat You Alive" with "Headstrong" by Trapt and "Me Against the Music" by Britney Spears as "worst song".

"Eat You Alive" was included on the compilations Greatest Hitz (2005), Collected (2008) and Icon (2011).

Track listing

Chart performance

References

External links

2003 singles
2003 songs
Limp Bizkit songs
Music videos directed by Fred Durst
Songs written by Fred Durst
Songs written by John Otto (drummer)
Songs written by Sam Rivers (bassist)